The Kura is a river in Stavropol Krai, Russia. The river is approximately 150 km long. It flows from North Caucasus and ends in the Nogai Steppe where it drains into the ground. Novopavlovsk, a town of 23,235 founded in 1777, is located on the left bank of the river.

References 

Rivers of Stavropol Krai